Doris Flores-Brooks is a Guamanian accountant, former bank executive and politician. Brooks is a former Republican senator in the Guam Legislature from 1989 to 1994. Brooks is known for being the first Chamorro to be a Certified Public Accountant. Brooks is also known for being Guam's first Public Auditor.

Education 
Brooks earned a Bachelor of Science degree from San Jose State University. Brooks earned an MBA from Harvard Business School.

Career 
Brooks became the first Chamorro to be a Certified Public Accountant.

Brooks is a former vice president and Chief Financial Officer of the Bank of Guam.

In November 1988, Brooks won the election and became a Republican senator in the Guam Legislature. Brooks served her first term on January 2, 1989, in the 20th Guam Legislature. Brooks served her second term on January 7, 1991, in the 21st Guam Legislature. Brooks served her third term on January 4, 1993, in the 22nd Guam Legislature, which ended on January 2, 1995.

In November 1994, Brooks lost the election as Lieutenant Governor of Guam. Brooks was defeated by Madeleine Z. Bordallo with 54.83% of the votes.

In November 2000, Brooks won the election and became Guam's first Public Auditor with Office of the Public Auditor (renamed The Office of Public Accountability). Brooks served as a Public Auditor from 2001 to 2018. Brooks resigned as Public Auditor on June 8, 2018. Brooks was succeeded by Yukari Hechanova, the Deputy Public Auditor, until a new Public Auditor is elected. 

On November 6, 2018, Brooks lost the election as a Guam Delegate to the U.S. Congress. Brooks was defeated by Michael San Nicolas with 54.85% of the votes.

In 2019, Brooks was appointed by Guam Governor Lou Leon Guerrero to the Public Utilities Commission. In 2019 at the national level, Brooks was appointed by President Donald J. Trump as a Commissioner of President's Advisory Commission on Asian Americans and Pacific Islanders.

Awards 
 1986 Executive of the Year. Presented by Guam Business Magazine.

Personal life 
Brooks' husband is James S. Brooks, an attorney. They have one son. Brooks also has four step-children. Brooks and her family live in Piti, Guam.

See also 
 Jack Abramoff Guam investigation

References

External links 
 Doris Flores Brooks at ballotpedia.org
 Doris F. Brooks at ourcampaigns.com
 Doris Flores Brooks elected as Chairwoman of the Pacific Association of Supreme Audit Institution’s (PASAI) at pacificnewscenter.com
 PASAI adds two new directors to its team at pasai.org
 Guam Public Auditor Doris Flores Brooks has been selected to participate in the Council of State Governments' Henry Toll Fellowship Program at opaguam.org

21st-century American women
Chamorro people
Government audit officials
Guamanian Republicans
Guamanian women in politics
Harvard Business School alumni
Living people
Members of the Legislature of Guam
San Jose State University alumni
Women accountants
Year of birth missing (living people)